Dioclea or Dioklea, Dioclia or Dioklia, Diocleia or Diokleia, was a town of ancient Phrygia, inhabited during Roman and Byzantine times.

In Hellenic times it had a mint, under its king Elagabalus. 

It was the see of a Christian bishop.  Lequien, names only two known bishops of the town. Constantius (fl 431 - 451) and Evander  No longer the seat of a residential bishop, it remains a titular see of the Roman Catholic Church as well as the Eastern Orthodox Church (for which it is now a metropolitan titular see, with Kallistos Ware as its metropolitan).

Its site is located near Yeşilhisar in Asiatic Turkey.

References

Populated places in Phrygia
Former populated places in Turkey
Roman towns and cities in Turkey
Populated places of the Byzantine Empire
Catholic titular sees in Asia
History of Afyonkarahisar Province
Hocalar District